Sahidnagar (Nepali: शहीदनगर ) is a municipality in Danusha District in Province No. 2 of Nepal. It was formed in 2016 occupying current 9 sections (wards) from previous 9 VDCs. It occupies an area of 57.37 km2 with a total population of 43,007.

References 

Populated places in Dhanusha District
Nepal municipalities established in 2017
Municipalities in Madhesh Province